Les Mains d'Orlac is a French fantasy/horror novel written by Maurice Renard, first published in 1920.  It is an early example of the body horror theme in fiction.

Plot 

The pianist Stephen Orlac suffers a railway accident that gives him serious head injuries and  deprives him of his hands. The famous and controversial transplant doctor Cerral gives him new hands, transplanted from a freshly guillotined assassin. Afterward, Orlac begins to wonder if he has become a Mr. Hyde who has inherited the criminal proclivities of his donor via his hands.

He seems to suffer from hallucinations and sinks into depression. His wife attempts to save him, but the couple are caught in a spiral of conspiracy, mystery and crime.

Origins
The character of Dr. Cerral was inspired by real-life French surgeon and Nobel Prize winner Alexis Carrel (1873–1944), and his experiments with biological transplants and grafting procedures.

Adaptations 

The story has been adapted into film and television many times, including the following:
 Orlacs Hände (The Hands of Orlac), a 1924 Austrian silent horror film 
 Mad Love, a 1935 American horror film
 The Hands of Orlac, a 1960 French-British film
 Hands of a Stranger, a 1962 American horror film

The story was also an inspiration for the 1976 Doctor Who serial The Hand of Fear.

References

External links
 Les Mains d'Orlac at ebooksgratuits.com

1920 French novels
French crime novels
French fantasy novels
French-language novels
French horror novels
Organ transplantation in fiction
French novels adapted into films
Novels first published in serial form
Psychological horror
Psychological novels